People's Navy may refer to:

Books
This People's Navy: The Making of American Sea Power, a 1992 book by Kenneth J. Hagan

Organizations
People's Liberation Army Navy, the navy of China
Volksmarinedivision, an armed group during the German Revolution of 1918-19
Volksmarine, the navy of East Germany
Korean People's Navy, the navy of North Korea
Vietnam People's Navy, the navy of Vietnam